Anton Kinnander (born 23 February 1996) is a Swedish footballer who plays for Eskilsminne IF as a forward.

Career

Ängelholms FF
After a season with Torns IF, it was announced on 27 November 2020, that Kinnander had joined Ängelholms FF for the 2020 season.

References

External links
 

1996 births
Living people
Association football forwards
Helsingborgs IF players
Motala AIF players
Ängelholms FF players
Allsvenskan players
Ettan Fotboll players
Swedish footballers
Torns IF players